Alejandro Enriquez Fuenmayor Castillo (born 29 August 1996) is a Venezuelan professional footballer who plays as a defender for Phoenix Rising FC of the USL Championship.

Career

Carabobo 
After coming through the youth ranks with Carabobo, Fuenmayor made his professional debut at the age of 18 on 22 September 2013 in a 2–0 win against Deportivo La Guaira. He made 11 starts in the 2016 Primera División as Carabobo qualified for the Copa Libertadores for the first time in their history by topping the aggregate table. Fuenmayor and Carabobo had a strong 2017. Carabobo finished on top of the aggregate table for the year, qualifying them for the 2018 Copa Libertadores. Fuenmayor started 32 games and anchored the best defense in the league, only allowing 25 goals in 34 games.  Carabobo also reached the semi finals of the Apertura and Clausura tournaments. Fuenmayor's performances were rewarded as he was named to the Team of the year.

Houston Dynamo 
After five seasons with Carabobo, Fuenmayor moved to Major League Soccer side Houston Dynamo on 16 January 2018. Fuenmayor made his Dynamo debut on 31 March 2018 in a 2–0 loss against the New England Revolution. He scored his first goal with the Dynamo on 5 May in a 3–2 win against the LA Galaxy. Fuenmayor scored 3 goals and had 1 assists from 22 league appearances in his first season in Houston, but it was a disappointing league campaign as the Dynamo finished 9th in the Western Conference and missed out on the playoffs. Houston did enjoy a successful cup run as Fuenmayor helped lead the Dynamo to their first ever U.S. Open Cup title, playing four times in the competition including starting the final, a 3–0 win over the Philadelphia Union.

Fuenmayor made his first appearance of the 2019 season on 2 March, a 1–1 draw with Real Salt Lake in the Dynamo's MLS season opener. On 5 March, he made his first career appearance in a continental competition when he started in a 2–0 loss to Tigres UANL in the CONCACAF Champions League. Fuenmayor struggled to remain in the Dynamo starting lineup in 2019 and spent time on loan with the Dynamo's USL Championship affiliate, Rio Grande Valley FC throughout the season, making 6 appearances for the Toros.  He ended the season with 8 MLS appearances and 12 appearances in all competitions for the Dynamo during another poor season for the team, missing out on the playoffs again.

Fuenmayor saw his playing time decrease further in 2020 under new head coach Tab Ramos, making 5 appearances all season as the Dynamo struggled once again, failing to qualify for the playoffs for the 3rd straight season.

During the 2021 season, Fuenmayor only made 3 appearances.  The Dynamo finished last in the Western Conference for the second consecutive season as Houston failed to qualify for the playoffs for the fourth straight year.

Fuenmayor's contract with Houston expired following the 2021 season.

Oakland Roots 
On 5 January 2022, Fuenmayor signed with Oakland Roots SC. He left Oakland following their 2022 season.

Phoenix Rising FC 
Fuenmayor signed with Phoenix Rising FC on December 23, 2022.

Career Statistics

Honors

Club

Houston Dynamo 

U.S. Open Cup: 2018

Individual 
Venezuelan Primera División Team of the Year: 2017

Dynamo Newcomer of the Year: 2018

References

1996 births
Living people
Venezuelan footballers
Carabobo F.C. players
Houston Dynamo FC players
Rio Grande Valley FC Toros players
Oakland Roots SC players
Phoenix Rising FC players
Venezuelan expatriate footballers
Venezuelan expatriate sportspeople in the United States
Expatriate soccer players in the United States
Major League Soccer players
USL Championship players
Association football defenders
Sportspeople from Maracaibo